Illinois's 3rd congressional district includes part of Cook County, and has been represented by Democrat Delia Ramirez since January 3, 2023. The district was previously represented by Marie Newman from 2021 to 2023, Dan Lipinski from 2005 to 2021, and by Lipinski's father Bill from 1983 to 2005.

It is adjacent to the 1st district to the east and south, the 4th district to the north, and the 11th district to the west, and also borders the 6th and 7th districts at its northwestern and northeastern corners, respectively. The district was created following the 1830 census and came into being in 1833, five months before Chicago was organized as a town; it initially included northern and western Illinois before representing areas of east-central and northwestern Illinois from 1843 to 1873. The district has included part of Chicago since 1873, and part of the city's southwest side since 1895; the district has been primarily suburban since 1973.

Geographic boundaries
The district includes the municipalities of Bedford Park, Bridgeview, Burbank, Chicago Ridge, Countryside, Forest View, Hickory Hills, Hodgkins, Hometown, Indian Head Park, Justice, La Grange, La Grange Park, Lyons, McCook, Merrionette Park, Oak Lawn, Palos Hills, Riverside, Stickney and Summit, nearly all of Berwyn, Brookfield, Western Springs and Willow Springs, and parts of Alsip, Burr Ridge, Cicero, Darien, Hillside, North Riverside, Orland Hills, Palos Heights, Palos Park, Westchester and Worth.

In the City of Chicago, it includes the communities of Bridgeport (home of mayor Richard M. Daley until he relocated in the late 1990s to the Near South Side's Central Station development), Clearing, Garfield Ridge, Mount Greenwood and West Lawn; almost all of Beverly; those portions of Archer Heights and West Elsdon west of Pulaski Road; the western portions of Ashburn, Chicago Lawn and Morgan Park; the portion of McKinley Park south of Archer Avenue; parts of Gage Park and New City; and a small section (1/16 mi2) of Armour Square.

2011 redistricting
The district covers parts of Cook, Du Page and Will counties, as of the 2011 redistricting which followed the 2010 census. All or parts of Chicago, Bridgeview, Burbank, Crest Hill, Hickory Hills, Homer Glen, Justice, La Grange, Lemont, Lockport, Oak Lawn, Palos Heights, Palos Hills, Romeoville, Summit, Western Springs and Worth are included. The representatives for these districts were elected in the 2012 primary and general elections, and the boundaries became effective on January 3, 2013.

2021 redistricting

Due to the 2020 redistricting, the district will shift to be primarily based in DuPage County, as well as parts of northern Cook County and the Northwest side of Chicago.

The 3rd district takes in the Chicago neighborhoods of Belmont Cragin, Montclare,  Hermosa, Logan Square, and Avondale; most of Albany Park, Irving Park, Portage Park, and Dunning; and parts of Humboldt Park, West Town, and Austin (Galewood).

Outside of the Chicago city limits, the district takes in the Cook County communities of Elmwood Park and Bartlett; most of Hanover Park; part of Elk Grove Village and Streamwood; and the portion of Franklin Park north of Franklin Ave; the section of Schiller Park between Franklin Ave and Highway 19 and portions of Elgin, River Grove, Des Plaines, and Mount Prospect.

DuPage County is split between this district, the 6th district, the 11th district, and the 8th district. The 3rd, 6th, and 11th districts are partitioned by Grand Ave, Highway 83, Central Ave, Fullerton Ave, Harvard Ave, Armitage Ave, Addison Rd, Highway 64, Westmore Ave, Plymouth St, Westwood Ave, Highway 355, Union Pacific Railroad, North Path, President St, Naperville Rd, Highway 23, Danada Ct, Arrowhead Golf Club, Herrick Rd, Galosh Ave, Butterfield Rd, Calumet Ave E, and Prairie Ave. 

The 3rd and 8th districts are partitioned by Bartlett Rd, Old Wayne Golf Course, St Charles Rd, Fair Oaks Rd, Timber Ln, Woodcreek Ln N, Wayne Oaks Dam Reservoir, Morton Rd, Pawnee Dr, County Farm Rd, Highway 64, Gary Ave Della Ave, West St, Geneva Rd, Bloomingdale’s Rd, Glendale Lakes Golf Club, President St, Gilberto St, Schubert Ave, Opal Ave, Stevenson Dr, Highway 4, Polo Club Dr, Canadian National Railway, East Branch Park, Army Trail Rd, Belmont Pl, Addison Trail High School, Woodland Ave, 7th Ave, Lake St, 3rd Ave, Eggerding Dr, Mill Rd, Highway 290, Addison Rd, Oak Meadows Golf & Banquets, Central Ave, Canadian Pacific Railway, Wood Dale Rd, Elmhurt St, and Lively Blvd.

The 3rd district takes in the municipalities of West Chicago, Wayne, Addison, Bensenville, Glendale Heights; most of Wheaton; and parts of Warrenville, Batlett,  Hanover Park, Carol Stream, Glen Ellyn, Villa Park, and Wood Dale.

Demographics
The district, situated between the Hispanic-majority 4th district to the north and the black-majority 1st and 7th districts to the east, is the home of numerous sizable and historic ethnic groups including Irish, Polish, Arab, German, Italian and Czech immigrants and their descendants. At 14.2%, the Irish make up the largest white ethnic group in the district, most prominently in the Bridgeport area (the ancestral neighborhood of the Daley family and other Chicago Irish politicians) and the Mount Greenwood-Beverly area; it is the largest Irish population in any district west of Philadelphia's suburbs. The Polish form the next largest white ethnic group at 13.5%, tying the northwest side's 5th district for the second highest percentage of any district, behind only New York's 27th congressional district. The next largest white ethnic groups are Germans (11.0%) and Italians (6.9%). Of the suburbs primarily south of 87th Street (in Palos and Worth Townships), 9 of 10 have larger Irish than Polish populations, usually by large margins; but north of 87th Street, in those areas in Lyons Township south of Interstate 55 or in the townships to the east of Harlem Avenue, 9 of 10 suburbs have greater Polish populations than Irish, again by large margins. In Oak Lawn, the district's largest suburb, Irish outnumber Polish 30%-19%; in neighboring Burbank, the district's third largest suburb, Polish outnumber Irish by an identical margin.

More recently a large Mexican community has moved to the district, notably in Berwyn, Cicero, Hodgkins and Summit where they represent over 30% of the population, and along Archer Avenue, a major Chicago artery that runs through the district's northern section. There is also a sizable Greek community in Oak Lawn and Palos Hills. In the last two decades, there has been notable Arab settlement in the vicinity of Bridgeview, and by the 2000 census, Arabs represented one of the five largest non-Hispanic ethnic groups in Bridgeview and three adjacent suburbs. Approximately 41% of the district's residents live in Chicago. Roughly 21% of the district's population are Hispanic, 68% are Caucasian, 6% are African American and 3% are Asian; redistricting following the 2000 census and the continued influx of Hispanics tripled the minority population from a decade earlier, as the district in its previous configuration had a population that was 7% Hispanic, 2% African American and 1% Asian. The more affluent areas of the district are generally located in its northwestern portion.

Economy
The district is a historic U.S. transportation and shipping hub; not only does it include Chicago Midway International Airport, but it is also traversed by the Chicago Sanitary and Ship Canal, the Calumet Sag Channel, and the Des Plaines River, earning national designations for the Chicago Portage National Historic Site in Forest View and the Illinois and Michigan Canal National Heritage Corridor. The path of historic Route 66 runs southwest through the district from its eastern end in Chicago. Interstate 55 intersects with both the Tri-State Tollway (Interstate 294) and the Dan Ryan Expressway (Interstate 90/94) in the district, and in 2001 – since which time the district has shifted slightly to the northwest – it was noted as likely having more freight yards and railroad crossings than any other district.

The district includes SeatGeek Stadium, home of the Chicago Red Stars team in Women's Professional Soccer, as well as Hawthorne Race Course; the area also benefits from Chicago White Sox home games at U.S. Cellular Field, which is less than  beyond the district's border. Portions of the Cook County Forest Preserves cover several square miles in the district's southwest corner. Cultural attractions include Brookfield Zoo and the Balzekas Museum of Lithuanian Culture in West Lawn; educational institutions include St. Xavier University in Mount Greenwood, Moraine Valley Community College in Palos Hills, Morton College in Cicero, and Richard J. Daley College, a Chicago city college, in West Lawn; and medical facilities include Advocate Christ Medical Center in Oak Lawn, Adventist La Grange Memorial Hospital in La Grange and MacNeal Hospital in Berwyn. A Ronald McDonald House adjacent to Advocate Christ opened in December 2008. Industrial and business presences in the district include: Tootsie Roll Industries; Electro-Motive Diesel; a Nabisco bakery which is the largest biscuit bakery in the world;  the Chicago Area Consolidation Hub of United Parcel Service and adjacent BNSF Railway yard;  an ACH Food manufacturing plant (formerly part of Corn Products Company) in Summit;  an Owens Corning roofing and asphalt plant in Summit; and a Nalco Chemical plant in Bedford Park. The former site of the International Amphitheatre, now an Aramark plant, is within the district. Organizations based in the district include the American Nuclear Society in La Grange Park. Among the federal facilities in the district is the Great Lakes Regional Headquarters of the National Archives and Records Administration in West Lawn.

Other district sites on the National Register of Historic Places include:
American State Bank, Berwyn
Berwyn Health Center
Berwyn Municipal Building
Avery Coonley House, Riverside
Cornell Square, New City, Chicago
Arthur J. Dunham House, Berwyn
First Congregational Church of Western Springs
Grossdale Station, Brookfield
Haymarket Martyrs' Monument National Historic Landmark, Forest Park
Hofmann Tower, Lyons
La Grange Village Historic District
Lyons Township Hall, La Grange
Old Stone Gate of Chicago Union Stockyards National Historic Landmark, New City, Chicago
George E. Purple House, La Grange
Ridge Historic District, Beverly/Morgan Park, Chicago
Riverside Landscape Architecture District, Riverside
Robert Silhan House, Berwyn
F.F. Tomek House, Riverside
Wayne Village Historic District
Western Springs Water Tower

Politics
The district has been described as "ancestrally Democratic, culturally conservative, multiethnic and viscerally patriotic." It earned a reputation as being home to Reagan Democrats when in the 1980 presidential election it was one of only two Chicago districts (out of nine) to be won by Republican Ronald Reagan, along with the 6th district (an almost entirely suburban district which also included Chicago's O'Hare Airport); the district simultaneously reelected Democratic congressman Marty Russo with nearly 69% of the vote. The Reagan Democrat description became even more appropriate when Reagan received 65% of the vote here in 1984 while Russo again won with 64%. Redistricting for the 1990s shifted the district into more reliably Democratic territory, but Bill Clinton won the district in 1992 by just a 41%-39% margin despite receiving at least 65% of the vote in four other south side districts; he won the district with 53% in 1996 although his totals in the other south side districts were all between 80 and 85%. George W. Bush received 41% of the vote here in both 2000 and 2004 despite not exceeding 21% in any of the other four south side districts; it was his best performance in any district located primarily within Cook County. Much of the district's current suburban territory was in the 4th district from the 1950s to the 1970s, when that was a solidly Republican suburban district represented by Ed Derwinski. More recently, Lyons, Palos and Riverside Townships in the western half of the 3rd district have all voted for Bush in 2000. Over the last eight presidential elections, the Democratic nominee for Congress has run an average of 20 points ahead of the party's nominee for president in the district.

Redistricting which took effect for the 1992 elections kept only 40% of the district's previous area, and pitted nine-term incumbent Russo – who changed his residence rather than run in the 2nd district, which now included his previous home – against five-term incumbent Bill Lipinski, who had previously represented the neighboring 5th district, in the Democratic primary. Lipinski ran close to Russo in the suburbs but easily won the Chicago areas, and won the primary 58%-37%. Lipinski was decidedly the most conservative Democrat in the Illinois delegation, opposing abortion and homosexual people serving in the military while supporting school prayer, tuition vouchers, the Defense of Marriage Act and the death penalty. He also helped to write a proposed constitutional amendment in 1997 prohibiting flag desecration. A member of the Blue Dog Democrats, he was one of just 30 Democrats to vote for the Republican welfare reform plan. He clashed often with the Clinton administration, opposing the president's position over half the time in the 1997-1998 Congress. He was one of 31 Democrats to vote in favor of a Judiciary Committee inquiry during the leadup to Clinton's impeachment; he eventually voted against impeachment, but simultaneously called on Clinton to resign. In 1999, Lipinski stated that Clinton "doesn't have credibility on military issues," adding that "the American people feel Clinton is unsure." He was a consistent opponent of U.S. free trade agreements, arguing that they were disastrous for American manufacturing. Lipinski received higher approval ratings from the American Conservative Union than from the ACLU in 12 of his last 13 years in office, though his highest ratings generally came from labor and consumer groups and the Christian Coalition. He received a 0 rating from the ACLU for the 1997–98 term, and also compiled an overall 0 rating from the National Abortion Rights Action League. His policies enabled him to work easily with Republicans; he was a candidate to become Transportation Secretary in the Bush administration, and collaborated with House Speaker Dennis Hastert of the 14th district to design the state's redistricting plan following the 2000 census.  and after surviving with a 54%-46% win amid the Republican gains of 1994 he was reelected by increasing margins in each succeeding election; in 2002 he became the first unopposed candidate in the history of the district.

In the 2018 Republican primary, the only option was Arthur Jones, a self-proclaimed member of the Nazi party and holocaust denier.  Although Jones received over 20,000 votes in the primary, many district GOP organizations took the unprecedented step of endorsing Rep. Dan Lipinski in the general election.

Recent election results

2004 

The district's seat changed hands under somewhat controversial circumstances in 2004. Lipinski was renominated in the primary election, but in August announced his intention to withdraw from the race, just two weeks before the deadline for replacing a candidate on the ballot. Four days later, the district's ward and township committeemen – including Lipinski himself as well as Mayor Daley's brother John and Illinois House Speaker Michael Madigan – met to choose a replacement; Lipinski nominated his son Dan, an assistant professor at the University of Tennessee, and he was approved without opposition despite not having lived in Illinois since 1989. In his initial campaign, the younger Lipinski stated that his policies made him "not really that different from" his father, and indicated that he would oppose same-sex marriage as well as abortion except when the mother's life was at stake. True to the district's heritage, he identified Reagan as his political hero.

2012

2018

2020 
Marie Newman won the 2020 Democratic primary against incumbent Dan Lipinski by 48.2% to 45.8%.

2022

Recent statewide election results

Election results reflect voting in the district as it was configured at the time of the election, not as it is configured today.

Prominent representatives

List of members representing the district

See also
Illinois's congressional districts
List of United States congressional districts

References

External links
Washington Post page on the 3rd District of Illinois
  - Congressional District Profiles, U.S. Census Bureau
 
U.S. Census Bureau - 3rd District Fact Sheet

03
Congress-03
Constituencies established in 1833
1833 establishments in Illinois